The Samuel M. Hitt House is located in the Ogle County, Illinois village of Mount Morris, along Illinois Route 64. The Hitt House is listed on the National Register of Historic Places, a status bestowed it 1985.

Architecture
The Samuel M. Hitt House was built by Samuel M. Hitt. It is designed in the Italianate style and features limestone wall material. The Hitt house was constructed in 1858.

Significance
The Samuel M. Hitt House was listed on the National Register of Historic Places on November 14, 1985, for its significance in the area of architecture.

Notes

External links

National Register of Historic Places in Ogle County, Illinois
Mount Morris, Illinois
Houses in Ogle County, Illinois
Houses on the National Register of Historic Places in Illinois